The 1948 All-Ireland Senior Football Championship was the 62nd staging of Ireland's premier Gaelic football knock-out competition.

Fermanagh play their last Ulster championship game until 1960.

Cavan won their second title in a row.

Results

Connacht Senior Football Championship

Leinster Senior Football Championship

Munster Senior Football Championship

Ulster Senior Football Championship

All-Ireland Senior Football Championship

Championship statistics

Miscellaneous

 Fermanagh withdraw from Ulster championship until 1960.
 The All Ireland semi-final between Cavan and Louth was their first championship meeting.
 Cavan becomes the first county from Ulster to be All Ireland Champions for 2 in a row.

References

All-Ireland Senior Football Championship